David Bradford Thornburgh (born October 6, 1958) is president and CEO of the Committee of Seventy, an influential independent government reform group in Philadelphia, Pennsylvania.  Prior to joining Seventy in December 2014, he served as executive director of the University of Pennsylvania's Fels Institute of Government. He is a frequent commentator on regional development, public policy and civic affairs. He has been recognized by Leadership Philadelphia as one of the most trusted and respected civic "connectors" in the Philadelphia area. He is the son of former Pennsylvania governor and U.S. Attorney General Dick Thornburgh.

Thornburgh graduated from Haverford College in Pennsylvania with a B.A. in political science. He later attended Harvard University's Kennedy School of Government, where he received a Master of Public Policy (MPP) degree.

Thornburgh went on to become the director of civic affairs at the CIGNA Corporation in Philadelphia. In 1988 Thornburgh was appointed as director of the Wharton Small Business Development Center, the consulting and training arm of the Wharton School's top-ranked Entrepreneurial Center, where he helped 20,000 entrepreneurs start and grow their businesses, raise $40 million in additional capital, and in the process create 4,000 new jobs in the region. In 1994, he left the SBDC to become the executive director of the Economy League of Greater Philadelphia, one of the nation's oldest and most respected private sector-led regional "think and do" tanks. While at the Economy League, he led efforts to reduce and restructure local taxes, improve the quality of the regional workforce, invest in arts and culture, and position the Philadelphia as an entrepreneurial, knowledge-based economy.  Following his time at the Economy League, in 2006, Thornburgh was named president and CEO of the Alliance for Regional Stewardship, a best-practice network of regional leaders in communities across the United States.
 
Thornburgh has received numerous awards, including an Eisenhower Fellowship in 2000 and was a finalist for the White House Fellowship in 1992. In 1991 he was chosen by the "Philadelphia Business Journal" as one of '40 Business Leaders Under 40'.  He and his wife Rebecca McKillip Thornburgh, a Wharton-MBA turned children's book author/illustrator, have lived in the Chestnut Hill section of Philadelphia since 1996.   Their two daughters, Blair and Alice, now in their twenties, were born and raised there and attended and graduated from Germantown Friends School. Lifelong musicians, Rebecca and David performed for nearly 20 years in an alt-country band called Reckless Amateurs, and David also played pedal steel guitar with The Miners, an original alt-country band. He is a lifelong scuba diver.

References

1958 births
University of Pennsylvania faculty
Haverford College alumni
Harvard Kennedy School alumni
Fels Institute of Government
Living people
American chief executives